Kim Soon-Mo is a South Korean film producer. He is known for his collaborations with Kim Ki-duk.

Filmography
 663114, (2012)
 Pietà, (2012)
 Moebius, (2013)
 Men, (2013)
 One on One, (2014)
 Made in China, (2014)
 The World of Us, (2016)
 The Net, (2016)
 Saem, (2017)
 Microhabitat, (2017)

References 

South Korean film producers
Year of birth missing (living people)
Living people